Chubby Creek is a stream in the U.S. state of Mississippi. It is a tributary to Gum Creek.

"Chubby" may be derived from the name of a Choctaw chief.

References

Rivers of Mississippi
Rivers of Itawamba County, Mississippi
Mississippi placenames of Native American origin